The Torul Dam is a concrete-face rock-fill dam on the Harşit River located  northwest of Torul in Gümüşhane Province, Turkey. The development was backed by the Turkish State Hydraulic Works. Construction on the dam began in 1998 and was completed in 2007. The dam's hydroelectric power plant was commissioned in 2008. It has an installed capacity of 121.5 MW.

See also

Kürtün Dam
List of dams and reservoirs in Turkey

References

Dams in Gümüşhane Province
Concrete-face rock-fill dams
Hydroelectric power stations in Turkey
Dams completed in 2007
Dams on the Harşit River
2008 establishments in Turkey
Energy infrastructure completed in 2008
21st-century architecture in Turkey